Espiar-e Molk (also Romanized as Espīār-e Molk) is a village in Firuzjah Rural District, Bandpey-ye Sharqi District, Babol County, Mazandaran Province, Iran. At the 2006 census, its population was 15, in 4 families.

References 

Populated places in Babol County